Carlos Mendes (born December 25, 1980) is an American soccer manager and former player currently serving as head coach of the United States Merchant Marine Academy women's soccer program. He holds American and Portuguese nationality, due to lineage.

Early life
Mendes grew up in Mineola, New York and attended The Wheatley School. He was voted a high school All-American his senior year. In addition to being an All-State and All-Region honoree, he was voted twice All-County (Nassau). As a student athlete at Old Dominion University Mendes was a three-time First Team All CAA (Colonial Athletic Association) selection in 1999, 2000 and 2001. Mendes was the 1998 CAA Rookie of the Year, and a two-time NSCAA United Soccer Coaches Association All-Region selection.

Playing career
Mendes started his career with the Long Island Rough Riders of the USL Pro Soccer League in 2002.  While playing for them, he became a defender. After playing for the Rough Riders in 2002 and winning the PDL title while scoring the equalizer in the Championship game against the Wilmington Hammerheads in N.C., Mendes moved up a division to play for Rochester Rhinos, where he became a consistent starter for the next two seasons.

Mendes signed with the MetroStars before the start of the 2005 season, and became the starter in central defense, filling the position formerly held by Eddie Pope. During the 2006 MLS campaign Mendes started every game on the season but one, which was due to caution point accumulation. For his efforts, he was voted team Defender of the Year by members of the soccer media.

Mendes continued his solid play anchoring the clubs backline during the early part of the 2007 season with New York Red Bulls. However, he fell out of favor with coach Bruce Arena and was in and out of the lineup during the latter part of the season. He concluded the campaign appearing in 23 matches (19 starts), his lowest totals since joining the club.  For the 2008 season Mendes was converted into a defensive midfielder and appeared in 17 regular season matches. He returned to central defense in the MLS Playoffs starting in the club's 1-0 victory over Real Salt Lake, helping the club reach its first ever MLS Cup Final. 2009 was an injury plagued season for Mendes as he was limited to 12 league appearances. Mendes began the 2010 season recuperating from his injury problems, once fully fit he replaced Mike Petke as Hans Backe's first choice center back pairing with first year player Tim Ream. On October 21, 2010 Mendes helped Red Bulls record its 13th clean sheet of the season in a 2-0 victory over New England Revolution which clinched the regular season Eastern Conference title.

On March 26, 2011, Mendes became the sixth New York player to hit 10,000 MLS minutes played for the club. By season's end he had moved into second place on the all-time franchise list in games played, games started, and minutes played.

On November 30, 2011, the Red Bulls declined the 2012 option on Mendes's contract, making him eligible for the 2011 MLS Re-Entry Draft. On December 5, 2011 Mendes was selected by Columbus Crew in stage 1 of the MLS Re-Entry Draft.  The Crew immediately picked up his option.

On December 11, 2012, Mendes signed on to play for the New York Cosmos in the team's inaugural year in the NASL, becoming the first professional player signed to the club. In his first year with the team he was named team captain, played and started in 14 games and also helped the club to wins in the NASL Fall Championship and the Soccer Bowl. Mendes anchored a defensive line that allowed just 12 goals on the season - the lowest total in the 2013 NASL Fall season and his contributions earned him a spot on the NASL Team of the Week three times across the season.

On April 13, 2014, Mendes scored the first two goals of his professional career in a 4-0 victory over the Atlanta Silverbacks, earning him NASL Player of the Week honors. During the 2014 NASL Spring season, Mendes led a defense that allowed an NASL-low three goals and set the modern day NASL shutout streak, going 372 minutes without conceding a goal.

Mendes finished the 2014 season with two goals and one assist in 25 starts and 25 appearances. He was named to the NASL Team of the Week a team-high five times and was one of two Cosmos players recognized in the NASL Best XI at the conclusion of the season.

In 2015, Mendes started 28 out of 30 NASL regular season matches, logging 2,498 minutes, high enough for second-most on the Cosmos. On Mother’s Day (May 10) vs. FC Edmonton, Mendes scored two goals in a 4-2 Cosmos victory. Mendes was named to the NASL's Best XI of 2015.

Mendes was inducted into the Long Island Soccer Football League's inaugural hall of fame class on November 22, 2015.

Coaching career
Following his playing days, Mendes went into coaching as an assistant with LIU Post.  In 2018, he re-joined the Cosmos as head coach of the Cosmos B team in the National Premier Soccer League.  In 2020, he moved up to became head coach of the first team.  The Cosmos went on hiatus in January 2021, and Mendes spent one season an assistant coach for Queens College before joining the staff of the U.S. Merchant Marine Academy as the head coach of the Mariners' women's soccer program in November 2021.

Career statistics

Honors

References

External links

 
New York Cosmos Profile 

1980 births
Living people
American soccer players
Old Dominion Monarchs men's soccer players
Long Island Rough Riders players
Rochester New York FC players
New York Red Bulls players
Columbus Crew players
New York Cosmos (2010) players
People from Mineola, New York
USL Second Division players
A-League (1995–2004) players
Major League Soccer players
North American Soccer League players
Association football defenders
American people of Portuguese descent
The Wheatley School alumni
National Independent Soccer Association coaches
National Premier Soccer League coaches
Queens Knights
College men's soccer coaches in the United States
College women's soccer coaches in the United States
Merchant Marine Mariners